James McIlroy (born 7 December 1977) is an English heavy metal guitarist. He was born in King's Lynn, Norfolk, grew up in Belgium before returning to England in 1996. He started his professional playing career in 2002.

Career
A guitarist in the British extreme metal band Cradle of Filth from 2003 until 2005, McIlroy played on the Nymphetamine album and special edition, as well as appearing on the Mannequin and Peace Through Superior Firepower DVDs.

He originally auditioned for the position in late 2002, and toured extensively for the Damnation and a Day and Nymphetamine albums, as well as appearances at the 2003 Ozzfest and Viva La Bam (2005), before leaving to pursue academia and work on other projects, his own band Chaosanct, as well as becoming part of the Order of Apollyon and English goth rock band NFD. In 2009, he returned for the second leg of Cradle of Filth's European Godspeed on the Devil's Thunder Tour.

McIlroy currently plays in his own bands Chaosanct, Order of Apollyon and NFD. He is currently working on the debut Chaosanct album as well as new material for all bands.

Discography
Nymphetamine – Cradle of Filth  (2004)
I of Goliath – Chaosanct  (2008)
The Ascendance of Impurity – Chaosanct  (2009)
March of the Titans – Gravil (2010)
The Flesh – Order of Apollyon (2010)
Darkly, Darkly, Venus Aversa – Cradle of Filth (2010)
Evermore Darkly – Cradle of Filth (2011)
The Sword and the Dagger – Order of Apollyon (2015)

Videography
Peace Through Superior Firepower
Mannequin
Evermore Darkly

References

External links

1977 births
Living people
English heavy metal guitarists
Cradle of Filth members